Böyük Gilətağ (also, Boyuk Gilatagh and Gilatagh) is a village in the Zangilan District, located in the south-west of the country of Azerbaijan.

References 

Populated places in Zangilan District